Yus, My Dear is a British sitcom that ran for nineteen episodes over two series in 1976 featuring Arthur Mullard and Queenie Watts in the lead roles. It was written by Ronald Chesney and Ronald Wolfe, and produced and directed by Stuart Allen for London Weekend Television. It was screened by ITV during 1976, and marked an early regular TV appearance of the comedian Mike Reid.

A sequel to Chesney and Wolfe's earlier series Romany Jones (1972–75), the characters Wally and Lily Briggs (Mullard and Watts) have left their caravan for a new life in a council house. The new series introduced Wally's brother Benny, the first acting role for the EastEnders and Snatch star Mike Reid of The Comedians fame.

The series, which gained modest ratings, has been described by the Radio Times Guide to TV Comedy as being one of the worst British sitcoms ever produced.

Cast 
 Arthur Mullard as Wally Briggs. Lil's Husband and Benny's brother.
 Queenie Watts as Lil Briggs, Wally's wife and Benny's sister-in-law.
 Mike Reid as Benny Briggs, Wally's younger brother, Lil's brother-in-law and Molly's boyfriend.
 Valerie Walsh as Molly, Benny Briggs' girlfriend.
 Pat Nye as Beatrice, Lil's older sister and Wally's sister-in-law. (Seen in episode "Three's Company".)
 Lynda Bellingham as Carol, Benny Briggs' ex-girlfriend. (Seen in episode "Woman Trouble".)
 Peter Hale as Jimmy, Wally and Lil's nephew. (Seen in episodes: "The Kid", "The Homework" and "The Repair".)

DVD release 
The two series of six and thirteen episodes were released on Region 2 DVD by Network.

References

External links

1970s British sitcoms
1976 British television series debuts
1976 British television series endings
ITV sitcoms
London Weekend Television shows
Television series by ITV Studios
Television shows set in London
English-language television shows
British television spin-offs